Danish rock band Volbeat has released eight studio albums, three live albums, three video albums, twenty-seven singles and twenty-three music videos.

Volbeat was founded in Copenhagen in 2001 by former Dominus member, Michael Poulsen. The line up was completed by guitarist Teddy Vang, bassist Anders Kjølholm and drummer Jon Larsen. Volbeat recorded their self-titled demo in 2002, followed by another demo called Beat the Meat. Franz Gottschalk replaced Teddy Vang before the second demo was recorded. The band was signed by Rebel Monster Records, a sublabel of Mascot Records. The Strength/The Sound/The Songs was released as Volbeat's debut album in September 2005 and reached number eighteen on the Tracklisten chart in Denmark. The second album, Rock the Rebel/Metal the Devil, was recorded in autumn of 2006. When the recordings were finished, Gottschalk was forced to leave the band. He was replaced by Thomas Bredahl. Rock the Rebel/Metal the Devil was released in February 2007 and peaked at number one in Denmark. Their third album, Guitar Gangsters & Cadillac Blood, was released on 29 August 2008 and debuted at number one in both Denmark and Finland. Volbeat's long-awaited fourth album, Beyond Hell/Above Heaven, was released in September 2010. It debuted at number one in Denmark, Finland and Sweden, and became their first appearance on the Billboard 200 in the United States. The album's lead single, "Fallen", reached the top twenty in Denmark, Finland and Sweden. They even made a cover for Metallica's Blacklist cover album.

Albums

Studio albums

Live albums

Video albums

Singles

Other charted and certified songs

Music videos

Notes

References

External links
 
 

Heavy metal group discographies
Discographies of Danish artists